Manabu Koga (5 April 1935 – 18 May 1974) was a Japanese freestyle swimmer who competed in the 1956 Summer Olympics.

References

1935 births
1974 deaths
Japanese male freestyle swimmers
Olympic swimmers of Japan
Swimmers at the 1956 Summer Olympics
World record setters in swimming
Asian Games medalists in swimming
Swimmers at the 1958 Asian Games
Asian Games gold medalists for Japan
Medalists at the 1958 Asian Games
20th-century Japanese people